Wilfrid Lawson Low (8 December 1884 – 30 April 1933) was a Scottish footballer who played as a centre-half for Aberdeen and Newcastle United.

Low was nicknamed the "Laughing Cavalier", although opposition forwards may have disagreed with this as he was a typical hard defender of that time. He played 367 games for Newcastle scoring 8 goals. He also played for the Scotland national team, winning five caps between 1911 and 1920.

Low remained with Newcastle after his playing retirement, firstly as a coach for the Swifts junior side, then latterly as the club's groundsman.

Personal life 
Low's brother Harry, nephew Willie and son Norman were also professional footballers. He served as a sergeant in the Royal Engineers at home during the First World War. He was killed in 1933 when a car knocked him over.

Honours

Newcastle United
FA Cup: 1909–10

See also
 List of Newcastle United F.C. players
 List of Scottish football families

Resources
A Complete Who's Who of Newcastle United, by Paul Joannou
Haway The Lads, The Illustrated Story of Newcastle United, by Paul Joannou, Tommy Canning/Patrick Canning

References

External links

1884 births
1933 deaths
Aberdeen F.C. players
Newcastle United F.C. players
Scottish footballers
Scotland international footballers
Scottish Football League players
English Football League players
Footballers from Aberdeen
British Army personnel of World War I
Royal Engineers soldiers
Montrose F.C. players
Newcastle United F.C. non-playing staff
Association football wing halves
Fulham F.C. wartime guest players
Road incident deaths in England
FA Cup Final players